Karen Elizabeth Dayes (February 13, 1972) is an American former soccer player and current coach who played as a sweeper or midfielder, making two appearances for the United States women's national team.

Career
Ferguson-Dayes played for the Sachem North Flaming Arrows boys' team in high school. In college, she played for the UConn Huskies from 1990 to 1993. She was an All-American in 1991, 1992, and 1993, and was included in the NCAA All-Tournament Team in 1990. She was a Soccer America MVP in 1992, and was included on the ISAA National Senior Recognition Team in 1993. Ferguson-Dayes was included in the NSCAA All-Northeast Region in 1991, 1992, and 1993, as well as the NEWISA All-New England in all four seasons. In 1994, she won the UConn Outstanding Senior Athlete Award. In total, she scored 17 goals and recorded 17 assists in 89 appearances for the Huskies.

Ferguson-Dayes made her international debut for the United States on August 14, 1992 in a friendly match against Norway. She earned her second and final cap for the U.S. on March 14, 1993 in a friendly match against Germany.

Ferguson-Dayes later began coaching, working as an assistant for the Boston University Terriers and the UConn Huskies, her alma mater. In 2000, she was appointed as the head coach of the Louisville Cardinals women's soccer. She is the most successful coach in program history, and was selected as the Big East Coach of the Year in 2011. While at Louisville, she also served as the assistant for the U.S. under-21 national team in 2003 and 2004, as well as the under-15 national team in 2005. She has also served as the coach of various regional youth selections and training programs, and holds a U.S. Soccer 'B' license. She was inducted into the Sachem Athletic Hall of Fame in 2003, as well as the New York State High School Girls Soccer Hall of Fame in 2018.

Personal life
Ferguson-Dayes is a native of Holbrook, New York, and was married to Hylton Dayes in 2008. She gave birth to a son, Brandon, in December 2008.

Career statistics

International

References

External links
 Interview with Louisville Women Sports 

1972 births
Living people
People from Holbrook, New York
Soccer players from New York (state)
American women's soccer players
American women's soccer coaches
United States women's international soccer players
Women's association football sweepers
Women's association football midfielders
UConn Huskies women's soccer players
Louisville Cardinals women's soccer coaches
Boston University Terriers women's soccer coaches
UConn Huskies women's soccer coaches